The Chancellor of the Exchequer of Ireland was the head of the Exchequer of Ireland and a member of the Dublin Castle administration under the Lord Lieutenant of Ireland in the Kingdom of Ireland. In early times the title was sometimes given as Chancellor of the Green Wax. In the early centuries, the Chancellor was often a highly educated cleric with knowledge of Finance. In later centuries, when sessions of Parliament had become regular, the Chancellor was invariably an MP in the Irish House of Commons.

The office was separate from the judicial role of Lord Chief Baron of the Exchequer of Ireland, although in the early centuries, the two offices were often held by the same person; on other occasions, the Chancellor was second Baron of the Exchequer. The first Chancellor appears to have been Thomas de Chaddesworth, Dean of St Patrick's Cathedral, in 1270. He was a judge but of the Court of Common Pleas (Ireland), not the Exchequer.

Although the Kingdom of Ireland merged with the Kingdom of Great Britain in 1801 under the Acts of Union 1800 to form the United Kingdom of Great Britain and Ireland, the Exchequer of Ireland did not merge with the Exchequer of Great Britain until 1817. The last separate Chancellor of the Exchequer of Ireland was William Vesey-FitzGerald.

List of chancellors
 1270 Thomas de Chaddesworth
 1292 Walter de Kenley
 1308 Walter de Thornbury
 1309 William de Clere (died before taking up office)
 1309–1310: John de Hotham
 1310 Nicholas de Balscote
 1326 Adam de Harvington (or Herwynton)
 1328 Thomas de Montpellier
 1330 Henry de Thrapston
 1333 Thomas de Brayles
 1334 Robert le Poer
 1344 William de Bromley
 1346 Robert de Emeldon
 1350 John de Pembroke
 1374 John de Karlell
 1376 Thomas Bache
 1385 William FitzWilliam
 1388 John de Troye
 1391 Robert Preston, 1st Baron Gormanston
 Robert de Herford (temp. Richard II)
 1399: Hugh Banent, or Bavent, also Clerk of the Crown and Hanaper
 c.1419-23: Robert Dyke, first term 
 1424: Sampson d'Artois
 c.1425-30 Robert Dyke, second term 
 1431: James Blakeney
 1436: Robert Cowdrey
 1446: John  Hardwick
 1461: Robert Norreys
 1478 Robert St Lawrence, 3rd Baron Howth
 1487 Walter Ivers
 1495: Edward Barnewall
 1521 Patrick Bermingham
 1532: Richard Delahide
 1535: John Alan
 1536: Thomas Cusack
 1561:Henry Draycott
 1572: Robert Dillon
 1577: John Bathe
 1586–1589: Sir Edward Waterhouse
 1589: Sir George Clive
 1590: Thomas Molyneux
 1596: Sir Richard Cooke
 1612: Sir Dudley Norton
 1616: Henry Holcroft
 27 October 1617: Thomas Hibbotts
 Henry Holcroft (in reversion after Hibbotts)
 1634: Sir Robert Meredyth
 1668: Richard Jones
 1674: Sir Charles Meredyth
 1687: Bruno Talbot (Jacobite)
 1690: Sir Charles Meredyth
 1695: Philip Savage
 1717: Sir Ralph Gore, 4th Baronet
 1733: Henry Boyle
 1735: Marmaduke Coghill
 1739: Henry Boyle
 1754: Arthur Hill
 1755: Henry Boyle
 1757: Anthony Malone
 1761: Sir William Yorke, 1st Baronet
 1763: William Gerard Hamilton
 1782: George Ponsonby
 23 April 1784: John Foster
 17 September 1785: Sir John Parnell, 2nd Baronet
 27 January 1799: Isaac Corry
 9 July 1804: John Foster
 24 February 1806: Sir John Newport, 1st Baronet
 30 April 1807: John Foster
 1811: William Wellesley-Pole
 11 August 1812: William Vesey-FitzGerald
 1816: Nicholas Vansittart (Chancellor of the Exchequer of Great Britain from 1812)
Irish Exchequer abolished 1817

References
Haydn's Book of Dignities (1851)

Further reading
 

Lordship of Ireland
Political office-holders in pre-partition Ireland

Early Modern Ireland